Beech Hill is an unincorporated community in Macon County, in the U.S. state of Tennessee.

History
The community was likely named from the presence of beech trees near the town site.

References

Unincorporated communities in Macon County, Tennessee
Unincorporated communities in Tennessee